Granastyochus fulgidus is a species of longhorn beetles of the subfamily Lamiinae. It was described by Monné and Martins in 1976, and is known from eastern Ecuador.

References

Beetles described in 1976
Acanthocinini